The Eiger Ultra Trail is an ultramarathon that mainly takes place on trails around Grindelwald in the Swiss canton of Bern in the Bernese Oberland. Since 2022, the E250 route has been the longest, with participants needing to cover 250 kilometers and overcome 18,000 meters of elevation. The section of the North Face Trail from the Eigergletscher to the Alpiglen railway station above Grindelwald is six kilometers long and is signposted as the Eiger Trail, local hiking route 353.

Routes 
E101 – Ultra Trail

Distance: 101 km / Höhenmeter: 6700 Hm

Grindelwald – Grosse Scheidegg – First – Bort – First – Bussalp – Faulhorn – Schynige Platte – Burglauenen – Wengen – Männlichen – Eigergletscher – Marmorbruch – Pfingstegg – Grindelwald

E35 – Nordwand Trail

Distance: 35 km / Höhenmeter: 2500 Hm

Burglauenen – Wengen – Männlichen – Eigergletscher – Eiger Trail – Alpiglen – Marmorbruch – Grindelwald

E16 – Genuss Trail

Distance : 16 km / 960 Hm

Grindelwald – Oberer Gletscher – Berien – Bort – Grindelwald

E250 – UNESCO Trail

Distance : 250 km

References